Gale is an unincorporated community in Center Township, Hendricks County, Indiana, United States. Gale is located on the east side of Danville, just along country road 300 east.

A post office called Gale was established in 1882, and remained in operation until it was discontinued in 1906.

Geography

References

Unincorporated communities in Indiana
Unincorporated communities in Hendricks County, Indiana